Dean Mazhawidza (born 22 March 1991) is a Zimbabwean first-class cricketer who plays for Mashonaland Eagles.

References

External links
 

1991 births
Living people
Zimbabwean cricketers
Mashonaland Eagles cricketers
Sportspeople from Harare